King of the Jungle is a 1927 American adventure film serial directed by Webster Cullison. The film is considered to be lost; only a trailer remains.

Cast
 Elmo Lincoln
 Sally Long
 Gordon Standing. Standing, a friend of co-star Elmo Lincoln, was killed after being mauled by a lion during production.  Lincoln believed that the death had been preventable and it led to his temporary retirement from the film industry.
 George Kotsonaros
 Arthur Morrison
 Cliff Bowes
 Virginia True Boardman

See also
 List of film serials
 List of film serials by studio

References

External links

1927 films
American silent serial films
1927 adventure films
American black-and-white films
Lost American films
American adventure films
1927 lost films
Lost adventure films
1920s American films
Silent adventure films